Kylix woodringi is a species of sea snail, a marine gastropod mollusk in the family Drilliidae.

Description
The size of an adult shell varies between 15 mm and 22 mm.

Distribution
This species occurs in the demersal zone of the Pacific Ocean off Panama.

References

  Tucker, J.K. 2004 Catalog of recent and fossil turrids (Mollusca: Gastropoda). Zootaxa 682:1–1295
 McLean & Poorman, 1971. New species of Tropical Eastern Pacific Turridae; The Veliger, 14, 89–113

External links
 

woodringi
Gastropods described in 1971